Anthropology is the science of humans.

Anthropology or Anthropologie may also refer to:

 "Anthropology" (composition), a jazz standard composed by Charlie Parker and Dizzy Gillespie
 Anthropology: And a Hundred Other Stories, a short story collection by Dan Rhodes
 Anthropologie, a chain of retail stores

See also 
 Anthropologist, a person who practices anthropology
 The Anthropologist (film), a 2015 documentary
 National Museum of Anthropology (disambiguation)
 Anthroponymy, the study of personal names